Zazom (also Romanized as Zazom) is a village in Borborud-e Gharbi Rural District, in the Central District of Aligudarz County, Lorestan Province, Iran. At the 2006 census, its population was 1,405, in 266 families, making it the most populous village in the rural district.

References 

Towns and villages in Aligudarz County